Events in the year 1953 in Japan.

Incumbents 
Emperor: Hirohito
Prime minister: Shigeru Yoshida (Liberal Democratic)
Chief Cabinet Secretary: Taketora Ogata until March 24, Kenji Fukunaga
Chief Justice of the Supreme Court: Kōtarō Tanaka
President of the House of Representatives: Banboku Ōno until March 14, Yasujirō Tsutsumi from May 18
President of the House of Councillors: Naotake Satō until May 19, Yahachi Kawai

Governors
Aichi Prefecture: Mikine Kuwahara 
Akita Prefecture: Tokuji Ikeda 
Aomori Prefecture: Bunji Tsushima
Chiba Prefecture: Hitoshi Shibata 
Ehime Prefecture: Sadatake Hisamatsu 
Fukui Prefecture: Harukazu Obata 
Fukuoka Prefecture: Katsuji Sugimoto 
Fukushima Prefecture: Sakuma Ootake 
Gifu Prefecture: Kamon Muto 
Gunma Prefecture: Shigeo Kitano 
Hiroshima Prefecture: Hiroo Ōhara 
Hokkaido: Toshifumi Tanaka 
Hyogo Prefecture: Masaru Sakamoto 
Ibaraki Prefecture: Yoji Tomosue 
Ishikawa Prefecture: Wakio Shibano 
Iwate Prefecture: Kenkichi Kokubun 
Kagawa Prefecture: Masanori Kaneko 
Kagoshima Prefecture: Katsushi Terazono 
Kanagawa Prefecture: Iwataro Uchiyama 
Kochi Prefecture: Wakaji Kawamura 
Kumamoto Prefecture: Saburō Sakurai 
Kyoto Prefecture: Torazō Ninagawa 
Mie Prefecture: Masaru Aoki 
Miyagi Prefecture: Otogorō Miyagi 
Miyazaki Prefecture: Nagashige Tanaka 
Nagano Prefecture: Torao Hayashi 
Nagasaki Prefecture: Takejirō Nishioka 
Nara Prefecture: Ryozo Okuda 
Niigata Prefecture: Shohei Okada 
Oita Prefecture: Tokuju Hosoda 
Okayama Prefecture: Yukiharu Miki 
Osaka Prefecture: Bunzō Akama 
Saga Prefecture: Naotsugu Nabeshima 
Saitama Prefecture: Yuuichi Oosawa 
Shiga Prefecture: Kotaro Mori 
Shiname Prefecture: Yasuo Tsunematsu 
Shizuoka Prefecture: Toshio Saitō 
Tochigi Prefecture: Juukichi Kodaira 
Tokushima Prefecture: Kuniichi Abe 
Tokyo: Seiichirō Yasui 
Tottori Prefecture: Shigeru Endo 
Toyama Prefecture: Kunitake Takatsuji 
Wakayama Prefecture: Shinji Ono 
Yamagata Prefecture: Michio Murayama 
Yamaguchi Prefecture: Tatsuo Tanaka (until 24 March); Taro Ozawa (starting 30 April)
Yamanashi Prefecture: Hisashi Amano

Events
 date unknown – The Japanese 10 yen coin is issued with serrated edges for a 5-year period, beginning in 1953. All 10 yen coins since have had smooth edges.
 June–August – Heavy massive rain, landslides, and flooding in western and southwestern Japan kill an estimated 2,566, and injure 9,433, mainly at Kizugawa, Wakayama, Kumamoto, and Kitakyushu.
 January 4 – NHK Radio broadcasts its first live marathon coverage. 
 June 18 – Tachikawa air disaster - 129 die after a United States Air Force Douglas C-124 Globemaster II crashes shortly after taking off from Tachikawa Airfield. 
 June 25 – 1953 North Kyushu flood hit in Chikugo River, Kitakyushu and Kumamoto area, 1013 persons were human fatalities, 2775 persons were hurt, according to Japanese government official confirmed report.
 July 20 – 1953 Kii Peninsula flood, according to Japanese government official confirmed report, 1124 persons were human fatalities, 5819 persons were wounded.
 August 15 – 1953 South Yamashiro flood, 429 person were human fatalities, with 994 person were hurt, according to Japanese government official confirmed report.
 September 23 – 1953 Typhoon Tess, 478 person were human fatalities, with 2559 persons were hurt, Japanese government official confirmed report.
 December 25 – The Amami Islands are returned to Japan from the US military following 8 years of occupation.

Births
 January 9
 Shigeru So, former long-distance runner
 Takeshi So, former long-distance runner 
 January 29 - Yorie Terauchi, actress
 February 4 - Kitarō, New Age musician
 February 13 - Kaoru Kurimoto, novelist and writer (d. 2009)
 February 23 – Satoru Nakajima, racing car driver 
 February 28 - Kōzō Murashita, singer and songwriter (d. 1999)
 March 18 - Takashi Yoshimatsu, composer
 May 1 – Mayumi Aoki, swimmer 
 May 4 – Masashi Ebara, actor and voice actor
 June 4 - Susumu Ojima, entrepreneur
 June 6 - June Yamagishi, Japanese guitarist
 July 12 – Akinobu Mayumi, former professional baseball player and coach 
 July 14 – Katsuya Okada, politician 
 July 19 - Shōichi Nakagawa, politician (d. 2009)
 July 31 - Tōru Furuya, actor, voice actor and narrator
 August 4 – Masataka Nashida, former professional baseball player and coach  
 November 28 - Taeko Onuki, singer-songwriter
 December 6 - Masami Kurumada, manga artist and writer
 December 9 – Hiromitsu Ochiai, former professional baseball player and coach   
 December 17 - Ikue Mori, drummer, composer, graphic designer
 December 28 - Tatsumi Fujinami, professional wrestler

Deaths
 January 4 - Yasuhito, Prince Chichibu
 February 19 - Nobutake Kondō, admiral
 May 28 - Tatsuo Hori, writer, poet and translator (b. 1904)
 July 7 - Tsumasaburō Bandō, actor
 September 7 - Nobuyuki Abe, politician, military leader, Prime Minister

See also
 List of Japanese films of 1953

References

 
Years of the 20th century in Japan
Japan
1950s in Japan